Danick Martel (born December 12, 1994) is a Canadian professional ice hockey forward who is currently playing under contract with the Laval Rocket in the American Hockey League (AHL). He has previously played in the NHL for the Philadelphia Flyers and Tampa Bay Lightning.

Playing career
As a youth, Martel played in the 2007 Quebec International Pee-Wee Hockey Tournament with the Drummondville Voltigeurs minor ice hockey team.

During the 2014–15 season, while playing with the Quebec Major Junior Hockey League (QMJHL)'s Blainville-Boisbriand Armada, Martel scored 48 goals and 54 assists, and was named to the QMJHL First All-Star Team. He was further honoured when he was named the 2014–15 CHL Humanitarian of the Year.

Unselected in any NHL Entry Draft, Martel signed a three-year, entry-level contract with the Philadelphia Flyers on March 10, 2015. He signed an amateur try-out with the Flyers' American Hockey League (AHL) affiliate, the Lehigh Valley Phantoms, on April 11, 2015.

In the 2017–18 season, Martel began his fourth season with the Phantoms and was leading the team and AHL with 14 goals in 17 games before earning his first call-up to the Flyers on November 22, 2017. He made his NHL debut that night against the New York Islanders, and would play three more games after that before being sent back to the AHL. In January 2018, Martel was selected for the 2018 AHL All-Star game; however, due to an injury, he was replaced by Oskar Lindblom. Nearing the end of the 2017–18 season, Martel was named the Phantoms' 2017–18 IOA/American Specialty AHL Man of the Year for his work in the community.

On September 22, 2018, Martel was claimed off waivers by the Tampa Bay Lightning. In the 2018–19 season, on December 18, 2018, in a 5–2 win over the Vancouver Canucks, Martel scored his first NHL career point, assisting on a goal scored by Cédric Paquette. Primarily serving as the Lightning's reserve forward on the roster, Martel served as healthy scratch to appear in just 9 regular season games for 2 goals.

On July 4, 2019, Martel was re-signed to a one-year, two-way contract extension with the Lightning. In the following 2019–20 season, Martel cleared waivers and continued in the AHL with the Syracuse Crunch, collecting 30 points in 52 games. On February 20, 2020, Martel was traded by the Lightning to the Florida Panthers in exchange for Anthony Greco.

As a free agent from the Panthers, Martel was unable to attract an NHL deal before signing a one-year AHL contract with the Binghamton Devils, affiliate to the New Jersey Devils, on January 9, 2021. In the pandemic delayed and shortened 2020–21 season, Martel added 6 goals and 14 points through 24 regular season games for Binghamton.

With Binghamton ceasing operations, Martel as a free agent signed a one-year AHL contract with hometown provincial club, the Laval Rocket, on 3 July 2021.

Career statistics

Awards and honours

References

External links

1994 births
Living people
Binghamton Devils players
Blainville-Boisbriand Armada players
Canadian ice hockey left wingers
Ice hockey people from Quebec
Laval Rocket players
Lehigh Valley Phantoms players
Philadelphia Flyers players
Sportspeople from Drummondville
Springfield Thunderbirds players
Syracuse Crunch players
Tampa Bay Lightning players
Undrafted National Hockey League players